Not the Only One may refer to:

 "Not the Only One" (Fiction Factory song)
 "Not the Only One" (Bonnie Raitt song)
 "Not the Only One" by Nikka Costa from Pro Whoa
 "Not the Only One" by Papa Roach from Who Do You Trust?

See also 
 I'm Not the Only One (disambiguation)